The Chronicles of Narnia is a series of English fantasy films from Walden Media that are based on The Chronicles of Narnia, a series of novels written by C. S. Lewis. A planned heptalogy, the series currently consists of three films—The Lion, the Witch and the Wardrobe (2005), Prince Caspian (2008), and The Voyage of the Dawn Treader (2010). The next film will be an adaptation of The Magician's Nephew.

The series revolves around the adventures of children in the fictional world of Narnia, guided by Aslan, a talking lion and the true king of Narnia. Most of the children featured were the Pevensie siblings and the prominent antagonist featured was the White Witch. While the films follow the novels' traditional storyline and Christian themes, they also added deviations from the source material, including the Greek Mythology and Irish fairy tales.

The first two films were directed by Andrew Adamson, produced by Mark Johnson, and distributed by Walt Disney Pictures. The third film is the first of the chronicles to be released in Digital 3D. It was directed by Michael Apted and distributed by 20th Century Fox.

The series is considered to be one of the biggest movie franchises around the world due to the legacy of the novels. The first film was a financial success by being the 52nd highest-grossing film of all-time. The series has now grossed over $1.5 billion making it the 25th highest-grossing film series of all time.

The Lion the Witch and the Wardrobe
The Lion the Witch and the Wardrobe won several awards including the Academy Award for Makeup; the BeliefNet Film Award for Best Spiritual film; the Movieguide Faith & Values Awards: Most Inspiring Movie of 2005 and Best Family Movie of 2005; and the CAMIE (Character and Morality In Entertainment) Award. Others include the British Academy Film Awards for Makeup and Hair and Orange Rising Star (James McAvoy); Outstanding Motion Picture, Animated or Mixed Media; the Phoenix Film Critics Society Award for Best Performance by a Youth in a Lead or Supporting Role (Georgie Henley, Female); the Costume Designers Guild Award for Excellence in Fantasy Film (Isis Mussenden); and the Saturn Award for Costumes (Isis Mussenden) and Make-up (Howard Berger, Greg Nicotero, and Nikki Gooley).

Georgie Henley, in her performance as Lucy Pevensie earned critical acclaim for her performance. She won several awards, including the Phoenix Film Critics Society award for Best Actress in a Leading Role and Best Performance by a Youth. She also won another awards either for Best Young Performance or Best Actress in a Leading Role.

The film was nominated for AFI's Top 10 Fantasy Films list.

Awards

Prince Caspian

Awards

The Voyage of the Dawn Treader
On December 14, 2010, The Hollywood Foreign Press Association nominated The Voyage of the Dawn Treader for the Golden Globe Award for Best Original Song ("There's a Place for Us") at the 68th Golden Globe Awards. It received three nominations at the Phoenix Film Critics Society Awards: Best Youth Actor (Will Poulter), Best Live Action Family Film, and Best Original Song. Poulter received a nomination for Young British Performer of the Year at the 2010 London Film Critics Circle Awards. The film also received four nominations at the 37th Saturn Awards. It was awarded the Epiphany Prize as the Most Inspiring Movie of 2010.

Awards

References

External links
 
 
 

Lists of accolades by film series
Accolades